Viola Alexander Lyles (born September 28, 1952) is an American politician serving as the 59th mayor of Charlotte, North Carolina, since 2017. A member of the Democratic Party, Lyles was a member of the Charlotte City Council before taking office as mayor.

Education and personal life
Lyles was raised in Columbia, South Carolina. Her father owned his own construction company and her mother worked as a teacher. She earned her Bachelor of Arts in political science from Queens University of Charlotte and a Master of Public Administration from University of North Carolina at Chapel Hill.

Lyles was married to John Lyles for 17 years prior to his death in 2013. Lyles has two children, Kwame and Aisha Alexander, as well as two stepchildren, Sean and John Lyles Jr. She lives in the SouthPark neighborhood in Charlotte.

Career

City council 
Lyles worked for the city of Charlotte, North Carolina, as a budget analyst, budget director, and assistant city manager. Starting in 2004, she worked as a consulting director for the Lee Institute and then for Flynn Heath Holt Leadership. She was the community outreach director for the 2012 Democratic National Convention.

Lyles was elected to the Charlotte City Council in 2013, and was elected mayor pro-tem in 2015. Following the shooting of Keith Lamont Scott in September 2016, she proposed a seven-point plan to reduce racial and class divisions in the city, parts of which were approved by the council. In February 2016, Lyles supported an LGBTQ non-discrimination ordinance that prohibited discrimination against LGBTQ individuals in public accommodations.

Mayoral campaign and election results 
Lyles ran for mayor of Charlotte in the 2017 election. She defeated Jennifer Roberts, the incumbent mayor, in the Democratic Party primary election in September 2017 by 15,805 votes (46.13%) to Roberts’ 12,412 votes (36.23%).

Lyles defeated Kenny Smith, a Republican city council member, in the 2017 Charlotte Mayoral Election, winning with 72,073 votes (59.15%) to Smith's 49,652 (40.75%). She is the first African-American female mayor of the city, and also its first former city administrator to serve as mayor.

In 2019, Lyles chose to run for a second term and after winning the Democratic primary as the Mayoral incumbent, was challenged by Republican David Michael Rice in the general election. Lyles won the election, holding 70,886 votes (77.3%) to Rice's 20,459 votes (22.3%).

Following another Democratic primary election in 2022, Lyles was again chosen as the Democrat candidate for the 2022 Charlotte Mayoral Election where her challenger was Republican Stephanie de Sarachaga-Bilbao. Lyles secured 49,324 votes (68.4%) and won election to her third mayoral term as de Sarachaga-Bilbao received a lackluster 22,580 votes (31.3%).

Endorsements 
During the 2017 Charlotte mayoral general election, Lyles received endorsements from both local and national groups including: Black Political Caucus, Charlotte Firefighters Association, Democracy for America, Human Rights Campaign, MeckPAC, Equality NC, and The Charlotte Observer.

Mayoral power 
The City of Charlotte has a professional city manager who runs day-to-day operations. The mayor along with four of the eleven council members are elected by the entire city while the other seven council members are elected by district.

Policy

Budget 
Governmental spending on policies is directly contributable to budget expenditures. The General Fund budget for the 2023 fiscal year in millions: Police 40.5% ($317.6), Fire 19.7% ($154.8), Solid Waste Services 9.6% ($75.3), Innovation and Technology 6.2% ($48.8), Financial Partners/Other 5.4% ($42.7), Internal Services 5.1% ($39.8), Transportation 3.9% ($30.4), General Services 3.1% ($24.7), Housing and Neighborhood Services 2.8% ($21.6), Planning 1.6% ($12.8), Street Lighting 1.2% ($9.8), Economic Development 0.8% ($6.6).

Economic expansion 
Mayor Lyles entered office in 2015 with Charlotte's unemployment averaging 5.30%. Lyles aided the creation of more than 27,000 new jobs by securing Charlotte as the location for expansion by Honeywell, Lowes, and Microsoft. This combined with the development of homegrown businesses, such as LendingTree and Avid Exchange, led to an influx of employment opportunities. As more jobs became available in Charlotte, the unemployment rate average decreased: 4.85% (2016), 4.38% (2017), 3.88% (2018), 3.68% (2019), 7.76% (2020), 4.67% (2021), and 3.76% (2022 Jan-Aug). Before the COVID-19 pandemic, the unemployment average in 2020 was 3.77% before jumping to a staggering 13.0% in April 2020.

Housing 
In April 2018, Lyles sought the expansion of the Housing Trust Fund, which promotes the construction of public housing for low-income renters through subsidies.

Public safety 
In 2021, Mayor Lyles and the city of Charlotte implemented a program called Alternatives to Violence in Charlotte to curb violent crimes and shootings. The program was first used in the Mecklenburg County area before expanding to the Beatties Ford and LaSalle county areas.

Race Equity 
On November 1, 2021, Mayor Lyles launched the Racial Equity Initiative that would invest $250 million to “address inequities and remove barriers to opportunity through four priority focus areas…” The project used those funds to build a new Center for Digital Equity, invest in Charlotte's six corridors of opportunity neighborhoods, turn Johnson C. Smith University into a top HBCU, and ensure commitment from organizations to advance black leaders and leaders of color throughout their corporations.

Transportation 
One of the areas of policy that Mayor Vi Lyles focuses her efforts on is the expansion of Charlotte because it is one of the fastest-growing cities in the nation. To connect the different areas of the city, Lyles alongside the Charlotte Area Transit System, opened a 19-mile light rail transit line. The railway that opened in Lyles’ first term, is expected to reduce traffic accidents and increase urban mobility and accessibility. Additionally, Lyles implemented a Vision Zero philosophy with the intention to further decrease traffic fatalities.

See also
 List of mayors of the 50 largest cities in the United States

References

External links

1952 births
African-American mayors in North Carolina
American city managers
Charlotte, North Carolina City Council members
Living people
Mayors of Charlotte, North Carolina
North Carolina Democrats
Politicians from Columbia, South Carolina
Queens University of Charlotte alumni
UNC School of Government alumni
Women mayors of places in North Carolina
21st-century American women politicians
21st-century American politicians
African-American city council members in North Carolina
21st-century African-American women
21st-century African-American politicians
20th-century African-American people
20th-century African-American women
African-American women mayors